Barry Thompson may refer to:
 Barry Thompson (rugby union) (1947–2006), New Zealand rugby union player
 Barry B. Thompson (1936–2014), American academic and administrator
 Barry James Thompson (born 1978), Australian and British developmental biologist and cancer biologist

See also
 Barry Thomson, guitarist in Bolt Thrower